Bracha Lichtenberg Ettinger (born March 23, 1948) is an  Israeli artist, painter and writer, visual analyst, psychoanalyst and philosopher, living and working in Paris and Tel Aviv. She is regarded as a major French feminist theorist and prominent international artist in contemporary New European Painting, that invented the concept matrixial (matricial) space / espace matrixiel (matriciel). Ettinger is a professor at European Graduate School in Saas-Fee, Switzerland and at GCAS, Dublin.

Life and work
Bracha L. Ettinger was born to Jewish-Polish Holocaust survivors in Tel Aviv on 23 March 1948. She received the high medal for war heroism, as she led the biggest rescue operation in the history of the Middle East, in 1967. She received her M.A. in Clinical Psychology from the Hebrew University of Jerusalem where she worked as research assistant then personal assistant of Amos Tversky (1969/70, 1973/74, 1974/75) and Danny Kahneman (1970/71). She married Loni Ettinger in June 1975 and moved to London where she studied, trained and worked between 1975 and 1979 at the London Centre for Psychotherapy (with Elsa Seglow), the Tavistock Clinic and the Philadelphia Association (with R. D. Laing) and became British citizen. Her daughter, the actress Lana Ettinger,  was born in London. She returned to Israel in 1979 and worked at Shalvata Hospital. Ettinger, who has painted and drawn since early childhood, is self-taught. In her early days she avoided the art scene. In 1981 she divorced her first husband, decided to become a professional artist and moved to Paris where she lived and worked from 1981 onward with her partner Joav Toker. Her son Itai Toker was born in 1988. As well as painting, drawing and photography, she began writing, and received a D.E.A. in Psychoanalysis from the University Paris VII Diderot in 1987, and a Ph.D. in Aesthetics of Art from the University of Paris VIII in 1996.

Ettinger had a solo project at the Pompidou Centre in 1987, and a solo exhibition at the Museum of Calais in 1988. In 1995 she had a solo exhibition at the Israel Museum in Jerusalem, and in 1996 she participated in the Contemporary art section of Face à l'Histoire. 1933–1996 exhibition in the Pompidou Centre. In 2000 she had a mid-life retrospective at the Centre for Fine Arts (The Palais des Beaux Arts) in Brussels, and in 2001 a solo exhibition at the Drawing Center in New York. As well as working as an artist, Ettinger continued to train as psychoanalyst with Françoise Dolto, Piera Auglanier, Pierre Fedida, and Jacques-Alain Miller, and has become an influential contemporary French feminist. Around 1988 Ettinger began her Conversation and Photography project. Her personal art notebooks have become source for theoretical articulations, and her art has inspired art historians (among them the distinguished art historian Griselda Pollock and international curator Catherine de Zegher) and philosophers (like Jean-François Lyotard, Christine Buci-Glucksmann and Brian Massumi) who dedicated a number of essays to her painting.

Based mainly in Paris, Ettinger was visiting professor (1997–1998) and then research professor (1999–2004) in psychoanalysis and aesthetics at the School of Fine Art, History of Art and Cultural Studies at the University of Leeds. Since 2001 she has also been visiting professor in Psychoanalysis and Aesthetics at the AHRC Centre for Cultural Analysis, Theory and History (now CentreCATH). Ettinger had partly returned to Tel Aviv in 2003 when she separated from her partner, and was a lecturer at the Bezalel Academy of Art and Design in Jerusalem until 2006. From 2006 on she became Chair and Professor at the EGS.
Inventor of the matrixial theory in psychoanalysis, some of her specific academic fields of endeavor are feminist psychoanalysis, art, aesthetics, ethics, the gaze, sexual difference and gender studies, Jacques Lacan, the feminine, early (including pre-birth) psychic impressions, pre-maternal and maternal subjectivity.

Artistic

Ettinger's art engages in the subject of trauma, mothers and women during war as well as the feminine in mythology Eurydice, Medusa, Demeter, Persephone and matrixial Eros. Her abstract research in painting concerns light and space, and in this it follows from Monet and Rothko. Her subjects concern the human condition and the tragedy of war, and her work in this aspect joins artists such as Käthe Kollwitz and Francisco Goya. The painting process engages a space of passage between figures and abstraction, and her attitude to abstraction resonates with the spiritual concerns of Agnes Martin, Emma Kunz and Hilma af Klint. Another major subject in her work is the unconscious and in particular the feminine and the maternal. Her notebooks accompany the painting process but are equally art works.

From 1981 until 1992, Ettinger's principal artwork consisted of drawing and mixed media on paper as well as notebooks and artist's books, where alongside theoretical work and conversations she made ink and wash painting and drawing. Since 1992, apart from her notebooks, most of her artwork consists of mixed media and oil paintings, with few parallel series that spread over time like: "Matrix — Family Album", "Autistwork" and "Eurydice", with themes of transgenerational transmission of personal and historical trauma, traces of memory and remnants of oblivion, the Shoah and the World Wars, the gaze, light, color and the space, female body, womanhood and maternality, inspired by classical painting and creating an abstract space where the questions of beauty and sublime are renewed for our time. Between 1984-2008, images that she obtains first by collage and xerox processing are abstracted in a long process of oil painting that takes a few years. From 2008 until now Ettinger works her oil paintings directly on canvas and is doing video art films that contains her drawings and photographs.

According to Griselda Pollock, Catherine de Zegher and Chris Dercon, director of the Tate Modern who had chosen her work for the contemporary art section of the Pompidou Center's major exhibition of 20th Century art Face à l'Histoire, Bracha L. Ettinger has become one of the major artists of the New European Painting. Along with painting she has worked on installations, theoretical research, lectures, video works, and "encounter events". Her paintings, photos, drawings, and notebooks have been exhibited at the Pompidou Centre, and the Stedelijk Museum in 1997. In the last decade, Ettinger's oil on canvas paintings involve figures like Medusa, Demeter and Persephone, and Eurydice and the subject matter of Pieta, Kadish, Eros and Chronos. Though from 2010 onward her work still consists mainly of oil paintings, Notebooks (artist's books) and drawings, she is also doing new media animated video-films where the images are multi-layered like her painting. In 2015, Ettinger participated with a solo show in the 14th Istanbul Biennial drafted and curated by Carolyn Christov-Bakargiev. In 2018-2019 she participated with a solo show at the Kochi-Muziris Biennale 2018 in India.

Reception 
Ettinger's work consists mostly of oil painting and writing. Ettinger is now considered to be a prominent figure among both the French painters' and the Israeli art's scenes. Ettinger's art was analysed at length in the book Women Artists at the Millennium, in Griselda Pollock's Encounters in the Virtual Feminist Museum and in Catherine de Zegher's anthology Women's Work is Never Done. Her ideas in cultural theory, psychoanalysis, and French feminism (see Feminist theory and psychoanalysis) achieved recognition after the publication of Matrix and Metramorphosis (1992), fragments from her notebooks (Moma, Oxford, 1993) and The Matrixial Gaze (1995). Ettinger established a new area of studies in psychoanalysis, art and feminism. Over the last three decades her work has been influential in art history, film theory (including feminist film theory), psychoanalysis, Feminist ethics, aesthetics and gender studies.

Group exhibitions
Among the venues Ettinger presented in:
 Castello di Rivoli, Turin (Espressioni Con Frazioni 2022).
 Castello di Rivoli, Turin (Espressioni. The Proposition 2020-2021).
 The Warehouse, Dallas (Psychic Wounds: Trauma in Art since 1945, 2020).
 Castello di Rivoli at OGR, Turin (Cuore di tenebra / Heart of Darkness, 2019).
 Kochi-Muziris Biennale (2018-2019).
 Mandes Wood DM Gallery, Brussels (Nightfall, 2018).
 Ekaterina Institute. Moscow (The Human Condition - The Hunted House, 2017–2018). Curator: Viktor Misiano.
 Bonnier Konsthall, Stockholm. (The Image of War, 2017). Curator: Theodor Ringborg.
 Gladstone Gallery, NY (Lyric on a Battlefield, 2017).
 MAS/KMSKA, Antwerpen (Encounters/Ontmoetingen. About art and emotion, 2017). Curator: Paul Vandenbroeck.
 GAM, Turin. (Colori, 2017). Curator: Carolyn Christov-Bakargiev with Marcella Beccaria, Elena Volpato.
 14th Istanbul Biennial (Saltwater, 2015). Curator: Carolyn Christov-Bakargiev.
 Museum of Modern Art, Warsaw (In the Heart of the Country, 2013–2014).
 The Pompidou Centre Paris (ELLES@centrepompidou, 2010–2011).
 Herzliya Museum of Contemporary Art (Eventually we'll Die. Young Art of the Nineties, 2008). Curator: Doron Rabina.
 Lokaal 01, Breda (The Aerials of Sublime Transscapes, 2008).
 The Royal Museum of Fine Arts, Antwerp (Gorge(l), 2006–2007).
 Kiasma Museum of Contemporary Art, Helsinki (ARS 06 Biennale, 2006).
 Art project at the Universities of Helsinki, Moscow, Novosibirsk, Beijing and in the Trans-Siberian train. (Capturing the Moving Mind, 2005).
 Gothenburg Museum of Art (Aletheia, 2003).
 Villa Medici, Rome, (Memory, 1999). Curators: Laurence Bosse, Carolyn Christov-Bakargiev, Hans-Ulrich Obrist.
 Israel Museum, Jerusalem (Voices from Here and There [Mar'ee Makom, Mar'ee Adam], 1999). Curator: Meira Peri.
 Haifa Museum & Theater [Women Artists in Israeli Art (the Nineties), 1998].
 Stedelijk Museum, Amsterdam (Kabinet, 1997).
 The Pompidou Centre (Face à l'Histoire, 1996). Curator Chris Dercon.
 Art Gallery of New South Wales, Sydney (Body, 1997).
 Art Gallery of Western Australia, Perth (Inside the Visible, 1997).
 Museum for Israeli Art, Ramat-Gan (Oh Mama, 1997).
 Institute of Contemporary Art (ICA) Boston, (Inside the Visible, 1996). Curator: Catherine de Zegher.
 National Museum of Women in the Arts, Washington, (Inside the Visible, 1997).
 Whitechapel Gallery, London (Inside the Visible, 1996).
 Israel Museum, Jerusalem (Routes of Wandering, 1992), Curator: Sarit Shapira.
 Tel Aviv Museum of Art (Israeli Art Now, 1991).
 Tel Aviv Museum of Art (Feminine Presence, 1990). Curator: Ellen Ginton.

Solo exhibitions
Ettinger's Solo exhibitions (Selection):

 Bracha Lichtenberg Ettinger. Radicants, Paris (2022).
 Bracha L. Ettinger. Andrew Kreps Gallery NY (2022).
 Bracha L. Ettinger: BRACHA's Notebooks. Castello di Rivoli Museum, Torino.
 Soloshow at Kochi Biennale, 2018.
 UB Anderson Gallery, Buffalo, 2018.
 Silesian Museum (Muzeum Śląskie w Katowicach), Katowich, 2017.
 Braverman Gallery, Tel Aviv, 2016.
 Callicoon Fine Arts, New York, 2016.
 Solo at Istanbul Biennial, 2015.
 Galería Polivalente in Guanajuato (Universidad de Guanajuato), Mexico (2015).
 Museo Leopoldo Flores. Univ. Autonóma del Estado de México, Toluca, Mexico (2014).
 Illuminations Gallery, Maynooth University, Ireland (2014).
 Freud's Dream Museum, St. Petersburg, Russia (2013).
 The State Museum of the History of St. Petersburg, Russia (2013).
 Casco, Utrecht (2012).
 Musée des Beaux-Arts d'Angers, France (2011).
 Fundació Antoni Tàpies, Barcelona (2010). (Alma Matrix. Bracha L. Ettinger and Ria Verhaeghe)
 Kuvataideakatemia / Finnish Academy of Fine Arts, Helsinki (2009).
 Freud Museum, London (2009).
 Gerwood Gallery, Oxford University, Oxford (2003).
 La librairie, Les Abattoirs, Toulouse (2003).
 Maison de France, Hebrew University, Jerusalem (2002).
 The Drawing Center, New York (2001).
 Centre for Fine Arts (The Palais des Beaux Arts), Brussels (2000).
 Cinemateque, Bergen.
 Pori Art Museum, Finland (1996), (Doctore and Patient. Bracha L. Ettinger and Sergei "Africa" Bugayev).
 Israel Museum, Jerusalem (1995).
 The Leeds Metropolitan University Gallery, Leeds (1994).
 The Museum of Modern Art (MOMA), Oxford (1993).
 Galerie d'Art Contemporain du Centre Saint-Vincent, Herblay, France (1993).
 The Russian Ethnography Museum in St. Petersburg, Russia (1993).
 Le Nouveau Muséem, IAC — Institut d'art contemporain, Villeurbanne, France (1992).
 Goethe Institute, Paris (1990).
 Gallery Charles Cartwright, Paris (1988).
 Musée des Beaux-Arts et de la Dentelle de Calais, Calais (1988).
 Moltkerei Werkstatt, Cologne, Germany (1987).
 The Pompidou Centre, Paris (1987).
 Charles Cartwright at Forain Gallery, Paris (1985).

Psychoanalyst
Ettinger is a theoretician who revolutionized psychoanalysis when she invented and developed a language for a feminine-maternal-'matrixial' (matricial) dimension in artistic creativity and in ethics of care and responsibility. She coined the concept of matrixial (matricial) space and matrixial gaze first in her artistic Notebooks from 1985 onward, and in academic publications from 1992 onwards. Ettinger's 'matrixial theory' since then and until today, proposing an unconscious feminine/maternal and pre-maternal/prenatal time-space of feminine sexuality and femininity in all genders, which go together with ethical care, 'seduction-into-life' and responsibility, where trans-subjectivity is in an ontology of string-like subject-subject (trans-subjective) and subject-object (transjective) transmissivity and affective co-emergence, transformed the way to think both the feminine and the human subject, both the analyst in transference relation and the analysant in its relation to her, in psychoanalysis. Working on the question of trauma, memory and oblivion at the intersections of human subjectivity, feminine sexuality, maternal subjectivity, psychoanalysis, art and aesthetics, she contributed to psychoanalysis the idea of a feminine-maternal sphere of sexuality and ethics, function, and structure where symbolic and imaginary dimensions are based on femaleness in the real (the meaning of matrix is womb). This dimension, as symbolic, contributes to ethical thinking about human responsibility to one another and to the world. The French philosopher Jean-Francois Lyotard related to Ettinger's writing and painting in two famous articles written in 1993 and 1995, Anima Minima (Diffracted Traces)  andL'anamnese (anamnesis). She is a senior clinical psychologist, and a supervising and training psychoanalyst. Her artistic practice and her articulation, since 1985, of what has become known as the matrixial theory of trans-subjectivity have transformed contemporary debates in contemporary art, psychoanalysis, women's studies, and cultural studies. Ettinger was an analysand of Ronald Laing in London and of Piera Aulagnier in Paris. She is member of the Tel Aviv Institute for Contemporary Psychoanalysis (TAICP), the New Lacanian School (NLS) and the World Association of Psychoanalysis (AMP / WAP). For Ettinger, the Freudian attitude to psychoanalysis is crucial as it emphasizes the phantasmatic value of materials that arise during regression. To Freud and Lacan she adds, however, a feminine-maternal space-time with its particular structures, functions, Eros, Aesthetic, Ethics and ethical potentiality (sh names matrixial proto-ethics) and dynamics in the unconscious. She claims that, in a similar way, when seduction is assigned to the paternal figure during regression, it is recognized in most cases as a result of the therapeutic process itself. The analyst therefore must become aware to her capacity for a 'seduction into life' as well as for retraumatizing the analysand. A matrixial ethical countertransference can be worked-through only in 'empathy within compassion' in where therapist avoids parent-blaming. The analyst develops her psychic womb-space to be able to work with the matrixial sphere for the directin of healing. Therapists must likewise realize that during regression phantasmatic maternal "not-enoughness" appears and must also be recognized as the result of the process itself, and be worked-through without the mother-hating that Ettinger considers contributes to a "psychotization" of the subject, which blocks the passage from rage to sorrow and from there to compassion. To be able to recognize the phantasmatic status of the psychic material arising during therapy, the Lacanian concepts of Symbolic, Imaginary and Real are useful to her. Ettinger works between the combined field of psychoanalysis and philosophy to change Ethics according to the feminine-maternal-matrixial source after Levinas and Lacan.

The idea of a corpo-Real is a part of her symbolization of a new feminine psychic zone (the matrixial, the womb as time space of psychic encounter-event), in both male and female subjects, and of the feminine-matrixial sexual difference. Thus, even if Ettinger critiques the Freudian and Lacanian analysis of the feminine, she considers herself as a "post" or "neo" Freudian and Lacanian, who elaborates the feminine in continuity to these psychoanalysts, but claims a supplementary feminine-maternal Eros. Ettinger criticises Winnicott and Bollas for offering patients a "ready-made mother-monster" as a cause for each psychic pain. She considers any practice of archaic-motherhood blaming as an obstacle, as "hystericizing" and even momentarily "psychoticizing" (in the sense of leading to internal splits rather than recognition of differences,) when such "cause" is brought as "explanation" by the analyst, a "cause" attributed to the unremembered early period of life where I and non-I are transconnected. Ettinger agrees with Lacan that the "ultimate" cause is in principle lacking: objet a. She calls for a delicate process of differentiation, coemergence, and cofading between the generations, especially in analysing the same-sex (daughter-mother, son-father) relationships, with emphasize on transmission, not split. Thus, the process itself helps to negotiate and articulate delicately sexual difference, in the present. To the idea that the self is structured via mirror-like reflection she adds that of primal apperception of the other, through "fascinance" (aesthetic openness to the other and the cosmos), compassion and awe (affective accesses to the other) directed from the beginning to the (m)Other and the outside, not to the self.

Psychoanalytic theory

Major concepts
Bracha Lichtenberg Ettinger revolutionized the field of psychoanalysis and cultural studies when she coined in artist's books (Notebooks) she exposed publicly starting from 1985 and in a long series of articles published since 1991 the concept of the matrixial (matricial) space and proposed the feminine matrixial time-space of feminine/prenatal encounter-event as source of human aesthetics and proto-ethics, and femininity as the deep core of ethics, which enters the human subjectivity via the maternal. 
Ettinger invented and developed the Matrixial Trans-subjectivity theory, or simply "The Matrixial", with original concepts like matrixial gaze, borderlinking, borderspacing, martrixial time-space, copoiesis, wit(h)nessing, co/in-habit(u)ation. She named the processes of transformation in a matrixial sphere: metramorphoses, and proposed the coemergnce of partial-subjects of I and non-I, female-prematernal-prenatal encounter, Encounter-event, ethical seduction into life, uncanny compassion and uncanny awe (that supplement the uncanny anxiety), fascinance, proto-ethics, being-toward-birth with being-toward-birthing, seduction into life, empathy within compassion, carriance (caring-carrying in the unconscious space of psychic pregnancy) and the matricial feminine-maternal Eros. Ettinger is a Freudian and Lacanian scholar and follows the late Jacques Lacan, Emmanuel Levinas, object relations theory and Gilles Deleuze/Félix Guattari. The encounter-event between the becoming-subject and feminine sexuality and body-psyche of prematernality informs human ethics as well as maternality.

The early theory: from 1985 through the 1990s
Ettinger invented the concept 'matrixial space' ('matricial space' from etymology of 'womb'), matrixial gaze, matrixial sphere, a feminine-maternal and feminine-prematernal dimension, space, function, Eros and dynamics in the human Unconscious that as the source of humanized ethics and aesthetics, and developed the theoretical concept in her artist's books and notebooks starting 1985, and in books and journals printed in academic journals from 1991 onwards. She had suggested that pre-natal impressions, connected to the phantasmatic and traumatic real of the pregnant becoming-mother, are trans-inscribed in the emerging subject and form the primary phase and position of the human psyche. "I" and "non-I", without rejection and without symbiotic fusion, conjointly inscribe memory traces that are dispersed asymmetrically but in a trans-subjective mode. Trans-subjective mental and affective unconscious "strings", connecting the prenatal emerging subject to the archaic m/Other, open unconscious routes ("feminine", non phallic, in both males and females) that enable subjectivizing processes all throughout life whenever a new matrixial encounter-event takes place. The matrixial encounter-event forms specific aesthetical and ethical accesses to the Other. Ettinger articulated the 'matrixial gaze' and the process of 'metramorphosis' and 'co-poiesis'. This allows new understanding of trans-generational transmission, trauma and artistic processes. Ettinger formulates the woman(girl)-to-woman(mother) difference as the first sexual difference for females to be viewed first of all according to the matrixial parameters. The feminine-maternal Eros informs also the father/son and mother/son relations. According to Ettinger, in parallel but also before expressions of abjection (Julia Kristeva) or rejection (Freud on Narcissism) of the other, primary compassion, awe and fascinance (which are unconscious psychic affective accesses to the other, and which join reattunement and differentiating-in-jointness by borderlinking) occur. The combination of fascinance and primary compassion does not enter the economy of social exchange, attraction and rejection; it has particular forms of Eros and of resistance that can inspire the political sphere and reach action and speech that is ethical-political without entering any political institutional organization. The infant's primary compassion is a proto-ethical psychological means that joins the aesthetical fascinance and creates a feel-knowing that functions at best within maternal (and also parental) compassionate hospitality. Awareness to the matrixial time-space, pre-maternal com-passion and maternal compassion together with the ethical 'seduction-into-life' it involves, is source of responsibility. Here, one witnesses in jointness: The I wit(h)ness while borderlinking (bordureliance) to the non-I and borderspacing (bordurespacement) from the other. Ettinger calls for the recognition of the matrixial transference as a dimension in the transferential relationships in psychoanalysis. They must entails besideness to (and not a split from) the archaic the m/Other (Autremere) and parental figures; jointness-in-differentiation rather than their exclusion. She sees in the trans-subjectivity a distinct dimension of human specific linkage and shareability, different from, and supplementary to "inter-subjectivity" and "self" psychology. Her most prominent and comprehensive book regarding this theory is "The Matrixial Borderspace" (reprint of essays from 1994–1999) published in French in 1999 and in English in 2006, but her most recent concepts are mainly elaborated in the different essays printed in 2005–2006.

The theory in the 2000s
Her more recent artistic and theoretical work centers around the spiritual in art and ethics. In the domain of psychoanalysis, around the question of same-sex differences, the primary feminine difference is the difference opened between woman (girl) and woman (m/Other), maternal subjectivity, maternal/pregnance Eros of com-passion, the effects of compassion and awe and the passion for borderlinking and borderspacing and the idea that three kinds of fantasy (that she names Mother-fantasies) should be recognized, when they appear in a state of regression aroused by therapy itself, as primal: Mother-fantasies of Not-enoughness, Devouring and Abandonment. Their mis-recognition in psychoanalysis (and analytical therapy), together with the ignorance of maternal Eros of com-passion leads to catastrophic blows to the matrixial daughter-mother tissue and hurts the maternal potentiality of the daughter herself, in the sense that attacking the "non-I" is always also attacking the "I" that dwells inside an "I"-and-"non-I" trans-subjective matrixial (feminine-maternal) tissue. Contributing to Self psychoanalysis after Heinz Kohut, Ettinger articulated the difference between com-passionate borderlinking, compassion (as affect) and empathy, and between "empathy without compassion" and "empathy within compassion", claiming that the analyst's empathy without compassion harms the matrixial psychic tissue of the analysand, while empathy within compassion leads to creativity and to the broadening of the ethical horizon. Ettinger explains how by empathy (toward the patient's complaints) without compassion (toward the patient's surrounding past and present family figures, no less than toward the patient itself), the therapist "produces" the patient's real mother as a "ready-made monster-mother" figure, that serves to absorb complaints of all kinds, and thus, a dangerous splitting is induced between the "good" mother figure (the therapist) and a "bad" mother figure (the real mother). This splitting is destructive in both internal and external terms, and mainly for the daughter-mother relations, since the I and non-I are in any case always trans-connected, and therefore any split and projected hate (toward such figures) will turn into a self-hate in the woman/daughter web. Such a concept of subjectivity, where "non-I" is trans-connected to the "I", has deep ethical implications as well as far-reaching sociological and political implications that have been further developed by Griselda Pollock in order to rethink modern and postmodern art and History. Ettinger's recent theoretical proposals starting around 2008 include the three Shocks of maternality and the paternal infnticide impulses (Laius Complex) Carriance and the Demeter–Persephone Complex, working around Greek Mythology and the Hebrew Bible, the woman artists Eva Hesse, Hilma af Klint and Emma Kunz and the poets and writers Sylvia Plath, Marguerite Duras and Alejandra Pizarnik.

Other activities

Artist Bracha Lichtenberg Ettinger led the biggest rescue, evacuation and saving operation in the history of the Middle East: saving the drowning young men of the Eilat shipwreck (in 1967), when she was 19 years old. She was wounded during the operation and suffered shell-shock after it. Only recently, 50 years later, this event was released from secrecy, and she was given the highest Air-Force medal for her Heroism. Ettinger is a supporter of the Palestinian rights, and an activist member in "Physicians for Human Rights" ("PHR-Israel"). Dr. Ettinger contributes to the organization as senior clinical psychologist, attending Palestinian patients in needed areas in the Palestinian occupied territories.

Ettinger is also famous for her portrait photography, taken in the context of conversation projects. Some of her portraits, like those of Christian Boltanski, Jean-François Lyotard, Joyce McDougall, Edmond Jabès, Emmanuel Lévinas, Robert Doisneau and Yeshayahu Leibowitz appear in several official publications and collections.

Fascinance: Forum for Ettinger Studies

Fascinance is forum started by Srishti Madurai in South India on 24 December 2013 which offers Introductory Course in Ettingerian Psychoanalysis

The aims of this group:
 To Read, Study and Discuss the works of Bracha L. Ettinger.
 To apply the matrixial theory in arts, philosophy, psychoanalysis and art criticism.
 To Find the possible implications of the concept of "non-life" of Bracha Ettinger in conjunction with the knowledge from various branches of biology such as clinical embryology, nenonatal immunology and developmental biology etc.
 To elaborate on the works on Matrixial Thanatos and Matrixial Eros and how Ettinger's approach differs from the traditional views on death drive.
 To identify how the Ettingerian theory differs from other psychoanalytic tradition and to discuss the philosophical aspects of matrixial borderspace.
 To identify the possible connections of Ettinger's works with natural sciences and social sciences.

Publications
Ettinger is author of several books and more than eighty psychoanalytical essays elaborating different aesthetical, ethical, psychoanalytical and artistic aspects of the matrixial. She is co-author of volumes of conversation with Emmanuel Levinas, Edmond Jabès, Craigie Horsfield, Félix Guattari and Christian Boltanski. Her book Regard et Espace-de-Bord Matrixiels (essays 1994–1999) appeared in French in 1999 (La lettre volée), and has been published in English as The Matrixial Borderspace (2006, University of Minnesota Press, edited by Brian Massumi and foreword by Judith Butler and Griselda Pollock).  Ettinger is one of the leading intellectuals associated with contemporary French feminism and feminist psychoanalytical thought alongside Julia Kristeva and Luce Irigaray. The journal Theory Culture & Society dedicated an issue to her work [TC&S, Vol.21, n.1] in 2004.

Selected books
 Matrixial Subjectivity, Aesthetics, Ethics. Vol 1: 1990-2000. Selected papers edited with Introduction by Griselda Pollock. Pelgrave Macmillan 2020. 
 And My Heart Wound-space. On the occasion of Bracha's Soloshow at The 14th Istanbul Biennial "Saltwater" curated by Carolyn Christov-Bakargiev. The Wild Pansy Press, University of Leeds, 2015.  With 4 essays by Bracha L. Ettinger, foreword by Carolyn Christov-Bakargiev, texts by Griselda Pollock, Tina Kinsella, Andrew Benjamin, Oded Wolkstein, Nicolas Bourriaud, Ruth Kaniel, Christine Buci-Glucksmann.
 The Matrixial Borderspace. (Essays from 1994 to 1999). University of Minnesota Press, 2006. 
 Proto-ética matricial. Spanish Edition translated and Introduced by Julian Gutierrez Albilla (Gedisa 2019) 
 Yhdessatuotanto. Translated by Akseli Virtanen et al. Helsinki: Tutkijaliitto (Polemos-sarja), 2009. 
 Thrown. Poems by James Wagner to Paintings by Bracha L. Ettinger. There Press, 2014. 
 Regard et Espace-de-bord matrixiels. Brussels: La lettre volee, 1999. 
 Matrix et le Voyage à Jerusalem de C.B. [Conversation with Christian Boltanski 1989, portrait photographs of C.B in his studio, by BRACHA, 1990, notebook fragments 1985-1989]. Artist's book. Paris: BLE Atelier, 1991.
 Matrix. Halal(a) – Lapsus. Notes on Painting, 1985–1992. Translated by Joseph Simas. Oxford: MOMA, 1993. 
 The Matrixial Gaze (1994). Feminist Arts & Histories Network – Dept. of Fine Art, Leeds University, 1995.

Selected publications
 "And My Heart, Wound-Space With-in Me. The Space of Carriance.' In: Bracha L. Ettinger. And My Heart Wound-Space. 14th Istanbul Biennial. Leeds: Wild Pansy Press. 2015.
 "Carriance, Copoiesis and the Subreal." In: Saltwater. 14th Istanbul Biennial Catalogue. Ed. by Carolyn Christov Bokargiev, 2015.
 "Laius Complex and Shocks of Maternality. Reading Franz Kafka and Sylvia Plath." Interdisciplinary Handbook of Trauma and Culture, eds. Y. Ataria et al, NY & Heidelberg: Springer, 2016.
 "Translucent Fore-images. Glowing through Painting." Colori. Torino: Castello di Rivoli & GAM, SilvanaEditorials. 2017. 
 "Beyond the Death-drive, Beyond the Life-drive—Being-toward-Birthing with Being-toward-Birth. Copoiesis and the Matrixial Eros—Metafeminist Notes." Aberrant Nuptials. Ed. by P.de Assis, P. Giudici. Leuven University Press. 2019.
 "The Sublime and Beauty beyond Uncanny Anxiety". In: Intellectual Birdhouse. Artistic Practice as Research. Edited by F. Dombois, U. M. Bauer, C. Marais and M. Schwab. London: Koening Books, 2011.
 "Antigone With(out) Jocaste". In: Interrogating Antigone. Edited by S. E. Wilmer and A. Zukauskaite. Oxford University Press, 2010 (189–214).
 "Communicaring: Reflexion around Hiroshima mon amour". In: PostGender: Sexuality and Performativeivity in Japanese Culture. Edited by Ayelet Zohar. Newcastle upon Tyne: Cambridge Scholars Publishing, 2010.
 "Diotima and the Matrixial Transference: Psychoanalytical Encounter-Event as Pregnancy in Beauty". In: Across the Threshold (Explorations of Liminality in Literature). Edited by C. N. van der Merwe and H. Viljoen. New York: Peter Lang. 2007. 
 "Fragilization and Resistance". In: Bracha L. Ettinger: Fragilization and Resistance. Edited by Tero Nauha and Akseli Virtanen. Finnish Academy of Fine Arts with Aivojen yhteistyo, Helsinki, 2009. Printed In: Maternal Studies 
 "From Proto-ethical Compassion to Responsibility: Besidedness, and the three Primal Mother-Phantasies of Not-enoughness, Devouring and Abandonment". Athena: Philosophical Studies. Nr. 2 (Vilnius: Versus). 2006.  ISSN 1822-5047 
 "Com-passionate Co-response-ability, Initiation in Jointness, and the link x of Matrixial Virtuality". In: Gorge(l). Oppression and Relief in Art. Edited by Sofie Van Loo. Royal Museum of Fine Art. Antwerpen, 2006. 
 "Gaze-and-touching the Not Enough Mother" In: Eva Hesse Drawing. Edited by Catherine de Zegher, NY/New Haven: The Drawing Center/Yale University Press. 2006. 
 "Matrixial Trans-subjectivity". Theory Culture & Society – TCS, 23:2–3. 2006. ISSN 0263-2764
 "Art and Healing Matrixial Transference Between the Aesthetical and the Ethical." In Catalogue: ARS 06 Biennale. 68–75; 76–81. Helsinki: Kiasma Museum of Contemporary Art. 2006.
 "Fascinance. The Woman-to-woman (Girl-to-m/Other) Matrixial Feminine Difference". In: Psychoanalysis and the Image. Edited by Griselda Pollock. Oxford: Blackwell. 2006. 
 "Art-and-Healing Oeuvre." 3 X Abstraction. Edited by Catherine de Zegher and Hendel Teicher, 199–231. NY/New Haven: The Drawing Center/Yale University Press. 2005. 
 "Trenzado y escena primitiva del ser-de-a-tres" (7 June 2000). In: Jacques-Alain Miller, Los usos del lapso, Los cursos psicoanaliticos de Jacques-Alain Miller. Buenos Aires: Paidos. 2004. 466–481. 
 "Copoiesis." In: Ephemera. 2005
 "Re - In - De - Fuse." In: Othervoices. 1999
 "Weaving a Woman Artist With-in the Matrixial Encounter-Event." In: Theory, Culture and Society Journal. No. 21. 2004
 "Trans-subjective transferential borderspace." (1996) Reprinted in Brian Massumi (ed.), A Shock to Thought. (Expression after Deleuze and Guattari). London & NY: Routeledge, 2002. 215–239. 
 "The Red Cow Effect." (First printed in 1996 in: Act 2, ISSN 1360-4287). Reprinted in:  Mica Howe & Sarah A. Aguiar (eds.), He Said, She Says. Fairleigh Dickinson University press & London: Associated University Press, 2001. 57–88. 
 "Matrixial Gaze and Screen: Other than Phallic and Beyond the Late Lacan." In: Laura Doyle (ed.) Bodies of Resistance. Evanston, Illinois: Northwestern University Press, 2001. 103–143. 
 "Art as the Transport-Station of Trauma." In: Bracha Lichtenberg Ettinger: Artworking 1985–1999, Ghent-Amsterdam: Ludion & Brussels: Palais des Beaux-Arts, 2000. 91–115. Extract in 
 "Transgressing with-in-to the feminine." (1997) Reprinted in: Penny Florence & Nicola Foster (eds.), Differential Aesthetics, London: Ashgate, 2000. 183–210. 
 "Trauma and Beauty."  In: Kjell R. Soleim [ed.], Fatal Women. Journal of the Center for Women's and Gender Research, Bergen Univ., Vol. 11: 115–128, 1999.
 "The Feminine/Prenatal Weaving in the Matrixial Subjectivity-as-Encounter." Psychoanalytic Dialogues, VII:3, The Analytic Press, New York, 1997. 363–405. ISSN 1048-1885
 "Metramorphic Borderlinks and Matrixial Borderspace." In: John Welchman (ed.), Rethinking Borders, Minnesota University Press, 1996. 125–159. .
 The Matrixial Gaze. (1994), Feminist Arts & Histories Network, Dept. of Fine Art, Leeds University, 1995. . Reprinted as Ch. I in The Matrixial Borderspace.
 "The Becoming Threshold of Matrixial Borderlines.". In: Robertson et als. (eds.) Travelers'  Tales. Routledge, London, 1994. 38–62. 
 Matrix . Halal(a) — Lapsus. Notes on Painting, 1985–1992. Translated by Joseph Simas. Museum Of Modern Art, Oxford, 1993. . (Reprinted in Artworking 1985–1999. Ghent: Ludion, 2000. )
 
 Matrix. Carnets 1985–1989 (fragments). In: Chimères, n. 16, 1992.

Conversations
 "From transference to the aesthetic paradigm: a conversation with Felix Guattari" (1989). Reprinted in Brian Massumi (ed.), A Shock to Thought. London & NY: Routeledge, 2002. .
 Matrix et le voyage à Jérusalem de C.B. (1989). Artist book, limited edition, with 60 photos of Christian Boltanski by Ettinger, and Conversation between Ettinger and Boltanski. 1991.
 Edmond Jabès in conversation with Bracha Ettinger (1990, selection). "This is the Desert, Nothing Strikes Root Here." In: Routes Of Wandering. Edited by Sarit Shapira. The Israel Museum, Jerusalem, 1991. 246–256. .
 Edmond Jabès in conversation with Bracha L. Ettinger (1990, selection). A Threshold Where We are Afraid. Translated by Annemarie Hamad and Scott Lerner. MOMA, Oxford, 1993. .
 Emmanuel Levinas in conversation with Bracha L. Ettinger (1991–93, selection). Time is the Breath of the Spirit. Translated by C. Ducker and J. Simas. MOMA (Museum of Modern Art), Oxford, 1993. .
 Emmanuel Levinas in conversation with Bracha L. Ettinger (1991–93, selection). "What would Eurydice Say?"/ "Que dirait Eurydice?" Reprint of Le féminin est cette différence inouïe (livre d'artiste, 1994 that includes the text of Time is the Breath of the Spirit). Trans. C. Ducker and J. Simas. Reprinted to coincide with the Kabinet exhibition, Stedelijk Museum, Amsterdam, Paris: BLE Atelier, 1997. . Reprinted in: Athena: Philosophical Studies. Vol. 2 (Vilnius: Versus). ISSN 1822-5047.
 "Working-Through." A conversation between Bracha Lichtenberg Ettinger and Craigie Horsfield. In: Bracha Lichtenberg Ettinger: Eurydice Series. Drawing Papers, n.24. NY: The Drawing Center. 2001. 37–62.
 "Conversation: Craigie Horsfield and Bracha L. Ettinger". September 2004. In: Craigie Horsfield, Relation. Edited by Catherine de Zegher. Paris: Jeu de Paume, 2006.
 Conversation between Bracha L. Ettinger and Akseli Virtanen, "Art, Memory, Resistance." In Framework: The Finnish Art Review 4: Permanent Transience and in Web Journal Ephemera, vol.5, no.X.

Lectures and seminars
 Bracha L. Ettinger. Beyond Uncanny Anxiety. Lecture at ICI Berlin. 12 November 2010.
 Bracha L. Ettinger. Inspiration, Inspiriting and Transpiriting. Fragilization and Resistance in Art. Lecture in: The Old Brand New Series: New Knowledge. De Appel at the City Theatre, Amsterdam. 10 February 2009.
 Bracha Ettinger. Feminine and the Maternal in the Matrixial Transference.  Lecture at University of Puerto Rico, Río Piedras, 2008. Quotes and images.
 Bracha Ettinger. On the Matrixial Borderspace. Lecture at European Graduate School. 2007. 104 min.
 Bracha Ettinger. Psychoanalysis and Aesthetics. Lecture at AHRB Centre CATH. July 2004.

See also
 New European Painting
 Feminist Psychoanalysis
 French Feminism
 The Sublime (Jean-François Lyotard)
 20th century Women Artists
 Écriture féminine
 Gender studies
 Feminist film theory

References

Further reading
 Catherine de Zegher and Griselda Pollock (eds.), Art as Compassion. Bracha Lichtenberg Ettinger. [Monography]. Ghent: MER. Paper Kunsthalle & Brussels: ASA Publishers, 2011. 
 Patrick le Nouene (ed.), Le Cabinet de Bracha. [English and French]. [Monography]. Musee d'Angers, 2011. 
 Christine Buci-Glucksmann, "Le devenir-monde d'Eurydice", published to coincide with the project "Capturing the Moving Mind", Paris: BLE Atelier, 2005. Trans. Eurydice's Becoming-World and reprinted as brochure for "The Aerials of Sublime Transscapes", Breda: Lokaal 01, 2008.
 Dorota Glowacka, "Lyotard and Eurydice: The Anamnesis of the Feminine." In: Gender After Lyotard. Ed. Margaret Grebowicz. NY: Suny Press, 2007. .
 Griselda Pollock, Ch. 6: "The Graces of Catastrophe". in: Encounters in the Virtual Feminist Museum: Time, Space and the Archive. Routledge, 2007. .
 Sofie Van Loo, "Eros and Erotiek" in ThRu1. Text / catalogue for virtual solo exhibition at Lokaal01, Antwerp, 2007. .
 Brigid Doherty, "Dwelling on Spaces". In: Women Artists as the Millennium. Edited by Carol Armstrong and Catherine de Zegher. Cambridge Massachusetts: October Books, MIT Press, 2006. .
 Griselda Pollock, "Rethinking the Artist in the Woman, The Woman in the Artist, and that Old Chestnut, the Gaze." In: Women Artists as the Millennium. Edited by Carol Armstrong and Catherine de Zegher. Cambridge Massachusetts: October Books, MIT Press, 2006. 35–83. .
 Griselda Pollock, "Beyond Oedipus. Feminist Thought, Psychoanalysis, and Mythical Figurations of the Feminine." In: Laughing with Medusa. Edited by Vanda Zajko and Miriam Leonard. Oxford University Press, 2006. 87–117. 
 Sofie Van Loo, Gorge(l): Oppression and relief in Art. Royal Museum of Fine Arts, Antwerp & Gynaika, 2006.
 Sofie Van Loo, "Titian and Bracha L. Ettinger: an artistic dialogue between the 16th and the 20th/21st centuries". In: Antwerp Royal Museum Annual, 2006.
 Jean-François Lyotard (1995), "Anamnesis: Of the Visible." Theory, Culture and Society, Vol. 21(1), 2004. ISSN 0263-2764
 Jean-François Lyotard (1993), "Scriptures: Diffracted Traces."(First version of "Anima Minima"). Theory, Culture and Society, Vol. 21(1), 2004.
 Judith Butler, "Bracha's Eurydice. Theory, Culture and Society'", Vol. 21, 2004. ISSN 0263-2764.
 Griselda Pollock, "Does Art Think?." In:  Dana Arnold and Margaret Iverson (eds.) Art and Thought.  Oxford: Basil Blackwell, 2003. .
 Heinz-Peter Schwerfel, "Matrix und Morpheus" in: Kino und Kunst. DuMont Literatur und Kunst Verlag, Koln. 2003. * Catherine de Zegher and Brian Massumi (eds.), "Bracha Lichtenberg Ettinger: The Eurydice Series".  Drawing Papers, n.24. NY: The Drawing Center, 2001.
 Brian Massumi, "Painting: The Voice of the Grain", In: Bracha Lichtenberg Ettinger: The Eurydice Series. [Catherine de Zegher and Brian Massumi (eds.)].  Drawing Papers, n.24. NY: The Drawing Center, 2001.
 Adrian Rifkin, "... respicit Orpheus",  In: Bracha Lichtenberg Ettinger: The Eurydice Series.  [Catherine de Zegher and Brian Massumi (eds.)].  Drawing Papers, n.24. NY: The Drawing Center, 2001.
 Christine Buci-Glucksmann, "Eurydice and her doubles. Painting after Auschwitz." In: Bracha Lichtenberg Ettinger: Artworking 1985–1999. Ghent-Amsterdam: Ludion & Brussels: Palais des Beaux-Arts, 2000. 
 Griselda Pollock and Penny Florence, Looking Back to the Future: Essays by Griselda Pollock from the 1990s. G&B Arts Press, 2000. .
 Paul Vandenbroeck, Azetta — L'art de femmes Berberes. Paris: Flammarion, 2000. 
 Adrien Harris, "Beyond/Outside Gender Dichotomies: New Forms of Constituting Subjectivity and Difference." Psychoanalytic Dialogues, VII:3, 1997. ISSN 1048-1885.
 Christine Buci-Glucksmann, "Images of Absence in the Inner Space of Painting." In: Catherine de Zegher (ed.), Inside the Visible. MIT Press, Boston, 1996.
 Griselda Pollock, 'Generations and Geographies in the Visual Arts. London: Routledge, 1996. .
 Rosi Huhn, "Die Passage zum Anderen: Bracha Lichtenberg Ettingers äesthetisches Konzept der Matrix und Metramorphose", In: Silvia Baumgart (Hrsg), Denkräum. Zwischen Kunst und Wissenschaft. Reimer, Berlin, 1993. .
 Rosi Huhn, Bracha L. Ettinger: La folie de la raison / Wahnsinn der Vernunft. Goethe Institut, Paris, 1990.
 Bracha L. Ettinger, "From transference to the aesthetic paradigm: a conversation with Felix Guattari." Reprinted in Brian Massumi (ed.), A Shock to Thought. Expression after Deleuze and Guattari. London & NY: Routeledge, 2002. .
 Fintan Walsh, "From Enthusiasm to Encounter-Event: Bracha L. Ettinger, Samuel Beckett, and the Theatre of Affect. Parallax, 17:2 (2011), pp. 110–123.

External links
 14th Istanbul Biennial Salt Water İKSV Medya İlişkileri / IKSV Media Relations, 2015.
 Heart String Space. Film by Nimrod Gershoni, Art and text by Bracha L. Ettinger at the 14th Istanbul Biennial, 2015.
 Artforum Interviews. interview by Annie Godfrey Larmon, 2018.
 NY Times Interview. "Art in a Time of Atrocity" interview by Brad Evans, 2016.
 Los Angeles Review of Books. "To Feel the World's Pain and its Beauty". Brad Evans interviews Bracha L. Ettinger, 2017.
 Russian State Museum of History, St Petersburg, Peter and Paul Fortress St. Petersburg. Interview by Marina Saburova, 2013
 Visiting Artist and Scholar at University of Puerto Rico Bracha L. Ettinger, 2008.
 Bracha Ettinger. Paintings 1992–2005. on Flickr.
 Anne Dagbert. Art exhibit at the Galerie Claude Samuel, Paris, France. Review. Artforum International. September 1, 1997.
 Adrian Rifkin. On Face à l'Histoire, Pompidou Centre art exhibit. Review. Artforum April 1997.
 ICI Berlin: Events
 Griselda Pollock interviews Bracha Ettinger. Crunch Festival Hay-en-Wye, Wales, 19 Nov. 2011.
 Podcast of UCD Humanities Institute lecture - Beauty in the Human: Uncanny Compassion, Uncanny Awe Podcasts | Bracha L. Ettinger

1948 births
20th-century French non-fiction writers
20th-century French philosophers
20th-century French women artists
21st-century French non-fiction writers
21st-century French philosophers
21st-century French women artists
Continental philosophers
Academic staff of European Graduate School
Feminist artists
Feminist philosophers
Feminist psychologists
Feminist studies scholars
Feminist theorists
Feminist writers
Film theorists
French contemporary painters
French feminists
French psychoanalysts
French women non-fiction writers
French women painters
French women philosophers
Israeli contemporary artists
Israeli painters
Israeli women painters
Jewish artists
Jewish philosophers
Jewish writers
Living people
Mass media theorists
Artists from Tel Aviv
Philosophers of art
Philosophers of culture
Philosophers of literature
Philosophers of psychology
Philosophers of sexuality
Postmodern artists
Postmodern theory
Social philosophers
Israeli women philosophers